Princess Duan (段王妃, personal name unknown) (died 358), formally Empress Chengzhao (成昭皇后, literally "the successful and accomplished empress") was the first wife of the Former Yan general Murong Chui, who would later become the founder of Later Yan.  She was the mother of his sons Murong Ling (慕容令) and Murong Bao.

Princess Duan was the daughter of Duan Mopei (段末柸), one in a line of Duan chiefs carrying the title of Duke of Liaoxi.  Because she came from an honored lineage (originally on par with Former Yan's imperial clan, the Murongs), she did not respect Murong Jun (Emperor Jingzhao)'s wife Empress Kezuhun, and Empress Kezuhun despised her greatly.  In 358, perhaps at her instigation, the eunuch Nie Hao (涅浩) falsely accused Princess Duan of witchcraft.  Murong Jun had her and her alleged coconspirator, Murong Chui's assistant Gao Bi (高弼), arrested.

Princess Duan and Gao were tortured, but they refused to admit the charges of witchcraft, and because of this the torture was intensified.  Murong Chui was saddened by his wife's suffering, and he sent her a message trying to persuade her to end her suffering by admitting to the charge (and thus end the torture but be sentenced to death).  Princess Duan remarked:

As she was interrogated, Princess Duan replied logically and openly, and Murong Chui was able to avoid being dragged into the case, but she still died in prison, either from the torture or a secret execution.

Murong Chui subsequently married her sister, and then her niece Duan Yuanfei as his wife.  In 388, after he had established Later Yan, he posthumously honored her as Empress Chengzhao.

References 
 Zizhi Tongjian, vol. 100.

358 deaths
Former Yan people
Later Yan
Chinese people who died in prison custody
Prisoners who died in Chinese detention
4th-century Chinese women
4th-century Chinese people
Year of birth unknown
Duan tribe
People accused of witchcraft
Chinese torture victims
Witchcraft in China
Later Yan posthumous empresses